Kang Byung-won (born 21 November 1973) is a South Korean politician in the liberal Democratic Party of Korea and has been a member of the National Assembly for Seoul Eunpyeong B since 2016.

Since 2 May, 2021, he is one of a 5-members of the party's top councilor.

Electoral history

References

External links
 
 

1970 births
Living people
Members of the National Assembly (South Korea)
Minjoo Party of Korea politicians
People from Seoul
Seoul National University alumni